Order of Bogdan Khmelnitsky  may refer to:

 Order of Bogdan Khmelnitsky (Soviet Union), state military award in the Soviet Union
 Order of Bohdan Khmelnytsky (Ukraine), state military award in Ukraine